A Bell for Adano (1945) is a film directed by Henry King and starring John Hodiak and Gene Tierney. It was adapted from the 1944 novel of the same title by John Hersey, which won the Pulitzer Prize for fiction in 1945. In his review of the film for The New York Times, Bosley Crowther wrote, "... this easily vulnerable picture, which came to the Music Hall yesterday, is almost a perfect picturization of Mr. Hersey's book."

In addition to the Broadway play (Cort Theatre, (12/06/1944 - 10/27/1945), which starred Fredric March, there have been several other versions of the story. In a 1955 Lux Video Theatre adaptation, Edmond O'Brien had the lead, with a young Charles Bronson playing the part William Bendix took in the movie. Barry Sullivan and Anna Maria Alberghetti were in a 1956 CBS telecast, and John Forsythe played the major in a 1967 Hallmark Hall of Fame broadcast.

Plot
The story concerns Italian-American U.S. Army Major Joppolo (John Hodiak), who is placed in charge of the town of Adano during the invasion of Sicily. Major Joppolo asks the town elders what the town needs most: some say food but most say "a bell" and his curiosity is raised. The priest explains that the whole heart of the town's activities centred upon the bell ringing. He then starts a long struggle to replace the 700-year-old bell that was taken from the town by the Fascists at the start of the war to be melted down for weapons. Through his actions, Joppolo also wins the trust and love of the people.

Some of the changes Joppolo brings into the town include:
 Democracy
 Free fishing privilege
 The freedom of mule carts
 A bell from the American Navy to replace the town bell

The short-tempered American commander, General Marvin, fires Major Joppolo from his position when Joppolo disobeys an order to prohibit mule cart traffic in Adano, which has been disrupting Allied supply trucks, because the mule carts are vital to the survival of the town.

The character of Joppolo was based on the real life experiences of Frank Toscani, who was military governor of the town of Licata, Sicily after the Allied invasion.

Cast
 Gene Tierney as Tina Tomasino
 John Hodiak as Maj. Victor P. Joppolo
 William Bendix as Sgt. Borth
 Glenn Langan as Lt. Crofts Livingstone
 Richard Conte as Nico 
 Stanley Prager as Sgt. Trampani
 Henry Morgan as Capt. N. Purvis
 Monty Banks as Giuseppe
 Reed Hadley as Cmdr. Robertson
 Roy Roberts as Col. W. W. Middleton 
 Hugo Haas as Father Pensovecchio
 Marcel Dalio as Zito
 Fortunio Bonanova as Chief of Police Gargano
 Henry Armetta as Errante
 Roman Bohnen as Carl Erba
 Luis Alberni as Cacopardo
 Eduardo Ciannelli as Maj. Nasta

Production
It was in production from early November 1944 to mid-January 1945. Location filming was done at Brent's Crags, near Malibu, California.

References

External links
 
 
 }
 
 1952 Best Plays radio adaptation of novel at Internet Archive

1945 films
1945 drama films
20th Century Fox films
American drama films
American black-and-white films
Films scored by Alfred Newman
Films based on American novels
Films directed by Henry King
Films set in Sicily
Italian Campaign of World War II films
Films with screenplays by Lamar Trotti
World War II films made in wartime
1940s English-language films